Natalie Ramsey (born October 10, 1975) is a television actress. Her passion for surfing led her to star in the television series Beyond the Break as Lacey Farmer. She has also starred in Cruel Intentions 3, Sandy in Cherry Falls, Pleasantville, and Children of the Corn 666: Isaac's Return playing Hanna Martin.

Filmography

References

External links

American television actresses
People from Milton, Massachusetts
Living people
1975 births
Actresses from Massachusetts
21st-century American women